Grape syrup is a condiment made with concentrated grape juice. It is thick and sweet because of its high ratio of sugar to water. Grape syrup is made by boiling grapes, removing their skins, squeezing them through a sieve to extract the juice. Like other fruit syrups, a common use of grape syrup is as a topping to sweet cakes, such as pancakes or waffles.

Names and etymology 
The ancient Greek name for grape syrup is siraios (σιραίος), in the general category of hepsema (ἕψημα), which translates to 'boiled'. The Greek name was used in Crete and, in modern times, in Cyprus.

Petimezi is the name for a type of Mediterranean grape syrup.  The word comes from the Turkish pekmez, which usually refers to grape syrup, but is also used to refer to mulberry and other fruit syrups.

Vincotto (not to be confused with vino cotto) is the southern Italian term for grape syrup. It is made only from cooked wine grape must (mosto cotto), with no fermentation involved. There is no alcohol or vinegar content, and no additives, preservatives or sweeteners are added. It is both a condiment and ingredient used in either sweet or savory dishes.

History

Greco-Roman 

One of the earliest mentions of grape syrup comes from the fifth-century BC Greek physician Hippocrates, who refers to  hépsēma (ἕψημα), the Greek name for the condiment. The fifth-century BC Athenian playwright Aristophanes also makes a reference to it, as does Roman-era Greek physician Galen.

Grape syrup was known by different names in Ancient Roman cuisine depending on the boiling procedure. Defrutum, carenum, and sapa were reductions of must. They were made by boiling down grape juice or must in large kettles until it had been reduced to two-thirds of the original volume, carenum; half the original volume, defrutum; or one-third, sapa. The Greek name for this variant of grape syrup was siraion (Greek: "σίραιον").

The main culinary use of defrutum was to help preserve and sweeten wine, but it was also added to fruit and meat dishes as a sweetening and souring agent and even given to food animals such as ducks and suckling pigs to improve the taste of their flesh. Defrutum was mixed with garum to make the popular condiment oenogarum. Quince and melon were preserved in defrutum and honey through the winter, and some Roman women used defrutum or sapa as a cosmetic. Defrutum was often used as a food preservative in provisions for Roman troops.

There is some confusion as the amount of reduction for sapa and defrutum. As James Grout explains in its Encyclopedia Romana, authors informed different reductions, as follows:The elder Cato, Columella, and Pliny all describe how unfermented grape juice (mustum, must) was boiled to concentrate its natural sugars. "A product of art, not of nature," the must was reduced to one half (defrutum) or even one third its volume (sapa) (Pliny, XIV.80), although the terms are not always consistent. Columella identifies defrutum as "must of the sweetest possible flavour" that has been boiled down to a third of its volume (XXI.1). Isidore of Seville, writing in the seventh century AD, says that it is sapa that has been reduced by a third but goes on to imagine that defrutum is so called because it has been cheated or defrauded (defrudare) (Etymologies, XX.3.15). Varro reverses Pliny's proportions altogether (quoted in Nonius Marcellus, De Conpendiosa Doctrina, XVIII.551M).Defrutum is mentioned in almost all Roman books dealing with cooking or household management. Pliny the Elder recommended that defrutum only be boiled at the time of the new moon, while Cato the Censor suggested that only the sweetest possible defrutum should be used.

In ancient Rome, grape syrup was often boiled in lead pots, which sweetened the syrup through the leaching of the sweet-tasting chemical compound lead acetate into the syrup. Incidentally, this is thought to have caused lead poisoning for Romans consuming the syrup. A 2009 History Channel documentary produced a batch of historically accurate defrutum in lead-lined vessels and tested the liquid, finding a lead level of 29,000 parts per billion (ppb), which is 2,900 times higher than contemporary American drinking water limit of 10 ppb. These levels are easily high enough to cause either acute lead toxicity if consumed in large amounts or chronic lead poisoning when consumed in smaller quantities over a longer period of time (as defrutum was typically used).

However, the use of leaden cookware, though popular, was not the general standard of use. Copper cookware was used far more generally and no indication exists as to how often sapa was added or in what quantity. There is not, however, scholarly agreement on the circumstances and quantity of lead in these ancient Roman condiments. For instance, the original research was done by Jerome Nriagu, but was criticized by John Scarborough, a pharmacologist and classicist, who characterized Nriagu's research as "so full of false evidence, miscitations, typographical errors, and a blatant flippancy regarding primary sources that the reader cannot trust the basic arguments."

Modern

Cyprus 
The ancient Greek name  hépsēma (now pronounced épsēma in Cypriot Greek) is still used to refer to the condiment, which is still made in Cyprus.

Greece 

Petimezi (Greek: πετιμέζι ), also called epsima (έψημα) and in English "grapemust" or "grape molasses", is a syrup that is reduced until it becomes dark and syrupy. Petimezi keeps indefinitely. Its flavor is sweet with slightly bitter undertones. The syrup may be light or dark colored, depending on the grapes used. Before the wide availability of inexpensive cane sugar, petimezi was a common sweetener in Greek cooking, along with carob syrup and honey. Petimezi is still used today in desserts and as a sweet topping for some foods. Though petimezi can be homemade, it is also sold commercially under different brand names.

Fruits and vegetables that have been candied by boiling in petimezi (epsima) are called retselia.

From late August until the beginning of December, many Greek bakeries make and sell dark crunchy and fragrant petimezi cookies, moustokoúloura (Greek: μουστοκούλουρα).

Petimezopita (Greek: πετιμεζόπιτα) is a spiced cake with petimezi.

Iran 
In Iranian cuisine, grape syrup (in ) is used to sweeten ardeh (tahini), which is consumed at breakfast. An alternative is date syrup, which is also widely used in Middle Eastern cooking.

Italy 
Saba, (from the Latin word sapa, with the same meaning), vincotto or vino cotto is commonly used in Italy, especially in the regions of Emilia Romagna, Marche, Calabria, and Sardinia, where it is considered a traditional flavor.

North Macedonia 
In North Macedonia, a form of grape syrup known as Madjun (Macedonian: Гроздов маџун) has been produced for centuries, commonly used as a sweetener, but also as traditional medicine. It never contains any added sugar.

South Africa 
In South Africa, the grape syrup is known as Moskonfyt.

Spain 

Arrope is a form of grape concentrate typically produced in Spain. Often derived from grape varieties such as Pedro Ximénez, it is made by boiling unfermented grape juice until the volume is reduced by at least 50%, and its viscosity reduced to a syrup. The final product is a thick liquid with cooked caramel flavours, and its use is frequent as an additive for dark, sweet wines such as sweet styles of sherry, Malaga, and Marsala.

Turkey 
In Turkey, grape syrup is known as pekmez.

The Levant 
Grape syrup is known as Dibs al-anab in the Arab Countries of the Levant (Jordan, Lebanon and Syria) and Davash Anavim in Israel, both means "Grape Honey", it is usually used as a sweetener and as part of desserts alongside carob syrup and bee honey, in Israel it is also used to sweeten wine and eaten with leben and toasted nuts such as walnuts and almonds for breakfast.

See also 

 Churchkhela, a sausage-shaped candy made from grape must, flour and nuts
 Drakshasava, an Ayurvedic tonic made from grapes
 Moustalevria
 Must
 Pekmez, a similar product in the Ottoman world
 Pomegranate syrup
 Vino cotto
 List of fruit dishes
 List of grape dishes
 List of syrups

References

Further reading 
 Theodoros Varzakas, Athanasios Labropoulos, Stylianos Anestis, eds., Sweeteners: Nutritional Aspects, Applications, and Production Technology, 2012, p. 201ff.
 Harris, Andy Modern Greek: 170 Contemporary Recipes from the Mediterranean. Chronicle Books, 2002.   
 Ilaria G. Giacosa; A Taste of Ancient Rome; University of Chicago Press;  (paperback, 1994)
 Pliny the Elder; Natural History; tr. H. Rackham; Harvard University Press (Loeb Classical Library);  (cloth, 1956)
 Marcus Porcius Cato; On Agriculture ; Harvard University Press (Loeb Classical Library);  (hardcover, 1979)

External links

James Grout, Lead Poisoning, part of the  Encyclopædia Romana

Condiments
Fruit dishes
Fruit juice
Grape juice
Greek cuisine
Lead poisoning
Oenology
Roman cuisine
Syrup
Toxicology